Solresol (Solfège: Sol-Re-Sol), originally called Langue universelle and then Langue musicale universelle, is a constructed language devised by François Sudre, beginning in 1827. His major book on it, Langue Musicale Universelle, was published after his death in 1866, though he had already been publicizing it for some years. Solresol enjoyed a brief spell of popularity, reaching its pinnacle with Boleslas Gajewski's 1902 publication of Grammaire du Solresol. 

Today, there exist small communities of Solresol enthusiasts scattered across the world.

Sudre or Gajewski 
There are multiple versions of Solresol, and they each have minor differences. Currently, there are three small variations on the language, each of which mostly edit vocabulary and a small amount of the grammar.

Sudre created the language, and thus his version deserves the title of being the original version of Solresol.

Vincent Gajewski popularised the language as the president of the Central committee for the study and advancement of Solresol, founded by Madame Sudre. Boleslas Gajewski, the son of Vincent, published the Grammar of Solresol. This is the most publicised version of Solresol, thanks to the translation to English by Stephen L. Rice from 1997, with a chunk of the vocabulary changed from the original, as well as some of the grammar. One example is the word fasol, defined as "here" in Sudre's dictionary, but "why?" in Gajewski's.

The third is an unofficial version developed over time by the community, dubbed "Modern Solresol". It uses Sudre's version as a base, with tweaks to the grammar and vocabulary, such as changing the definitions of sisol and sila from meaning "Sir" and "Young man", to an honorifics system inspired by what is used in Japanese; both are gender-neutral titles, one to be respectful, and one to be affectionate.

Gajewski's publication brought various additions that don't conflict with the original version of the language, such as various new methods of communication, including a set of symbols, using the seven colours of the rainbow, using Tonic sol-fa to sign the language, and more.

Phonology 

Solresol can be communicated by using any seven distinct items, with a maximum of five per word. The main method of communication is by using the seven solfège syllables (a form of solmization), which may be accented, lengthened or repeated. The simplest way to use these syllables is to speak them as if they were regular syllables.

Due to predating the IPA, there are no specific pronunciation rules beyond the standard readings of the solfège. Due to each syllable being fairly distinct, they may be pronounced in almost any way the reader prefers. Although the seventh note is more modernly pronounced as "Ti" in a lot of countries, "Si" is still generally preferred within the Solresol community.

Sudre outlined a way of transcribing the phonetics of French (and thus many other languages) into Solresol, primarily used for proper nouns. Using common pronunciations as given by the likes of Wiktionary, it is possible to reconstruct a table of sounds using the modern IPA.

Due to the paucity of syllables, it is necessary to leave a brief pause between words so that each word remains clearly separate. As noted by Boleslas Gajewski: "one should take great care to pause after every word; this slight pause is necessary to separate the words, so that the listener does not become confused".

Vocabulary 
In Solresol morphology, each word is divided into categories of either meaning or function, where longer words are generally more specific. Words are differentiated by three main characteristics: the initial syllable, word length, and whether it has a pair of repeated syllables.

Words of syllable length 1 and 2 are used for pronouns and common particles, and those with repeated syllables are tenses.

Words of syllable length 3 are devoted to words used frequently (at the time of Solresol's creation). The ones which include repeating syllables are reserved for "numbers, the months of the year, the days of the week, and temperature [weather conditions]", e.g. redodo "one", remimi "two" (according to Gajewski).

Words of syllable length 4 fall into various themed categories. For example, words beginning with 'sol', which include no repeating syllables, have meanings related to arts or sciences (e.g. soldoredo, "art"; solmiredo, "acoustic"). However, if words of syllable length 4 have a pair of repeated syllables, their meanings relate to sickness or medicine (e.g. solsolredo, "migraine"; solreresol, "smallpox").

More specifically, the classes without repeating syllables, are:

1. 'do': man, his body and spirit, intellectual faculties, qualities and nourishment;

2. 're': clothing, the house, housekeeping and the family

3. 'mi': man's actions and his flaws

4. 'fa': the countryside, travel, war, the sea

5. 'sol': fine arts and sciences

6. 'la': industry and commerce

7. 'si': the city, government and administration

With repeating syllables, the same syllables yield:

1. 'do': religion

2. 're': construction and various trades

3. 'mi': prepositions, adverbial phrases and isolated adverbs

4. 'fa': sickness

5. 'sol': sickness (cont.)

6. 'la': industry and commerce (as in the non-repeating type)

7. 'si': justice, the magistracy, and the courts

Finally, combinations of five syllables designate animals, plants and minerals.

By default, all animate nouns and pronouns imply that they are of male sex. To differentiate the female sex, you add a bar, hyphen or macron to the final syllable of the corresponding article or the word itself. In speech, this is indicated by repeating the vowel of the syllable, with a glottal stop separating the repeated vowel from the rest of the word.

However, in modern translations, pronouns do not change depending on gender. Instead, they are simply translated into English as neutral pronouns; it and they.

A unique feature of Solresol is that meanings can be inverted by reversing the syllables in words. For instance fala means good or tasty, and lafa means bad. Interruptions in the logical order of words in each category are usually caused by these reversible words. However, not all words are reversible in this sense, such as dorefare meaning neck, and refaredo meaning wardrobe, which are obviously not opposites.

The following table shows the words of up to two syllables from Gajewski's dictionary:

The definite article has different forms for nominative, genitive and dative case, or, in other words, for "the", "to the", and "of the": 'la', 'fa' and 'la si', respectively.

Grammar
Apart from stress and length, Solresol words are not inflected. To keep sentences clear, especially with the possibility of information loss while communicating, certain parts of speech follow a strict word order.

Adjectives always follow the noun they modify.
Indirect objects always come after the verb.
Examples given throughout the original documentation hint at a SVO word order, however, it shouldn't matter as long as the sentence remains simple and clear.
Tenses always precede verbs.

To make a word plural, you place an acute accent above the last syllable, which in speech is pronounced by lengthening the last letter of said syllable. Examples of how to mark plural masculine and feminine words:

resimire brother, resimirē/resimire-e sister
resimiré brothers, resimiréē/resimiré-e sisters

This only affects the first word in a noun phrase. That is, it only affects a noun when the noun is alone, as above. If the word is accompanied by a grammatical particle (la, fa or lasi), the particle will take the gender and or number marking instead:

la resimire [the] brother, lā/la-a resimire [the] sister
lá resimire [the] brothers, láā/lá-a resimire [the] sisters

Parts of speech (as well as more specific definitions for certain words) are derived from verbs by placing a circumflex above one of the syllables in writing, and by pronouncing said syllable with rinforzando (sudden emphasis or crescendo). With the accent placed on the first syllable, the word becomes a noun. In four-syllable words, accentuating the second syllable creates an agent noun. The penultimate syllable produces an adjective, and the last creates an adverb. For example,

midofa to prefer, mîdofa preference, midôfa preferable, midofâ preferably
resolmila to continue, rêsolmila continuation, resôlmila one who continues, resolmîla continual, resolmilâ continually

On computers using keyboard layouts without the circumflex accent, you can either print the syllable using capital letters, or place a caret between letters of a syllable or after a syllable. Due to the grammar and word order of Solresol, distinguishing parts of speech aren't usually required to understand the sentence.

The various tense-and-mood particles are the double syllables, as given in vocabulary above. In addition, according to Gajewski, passive verbs are formed with faremi between this particle and the verb. The subjunctive is formed with mire before the pronoun. The negative do only appears once in the clause, before the word it negates.

The word fasi before a noun or adjective is augmentative; after it is superlative. Sifa is the opposite (diminutive):

fala good, fasi fala very good, fala fasi excellent, the best; sifa fala okay, fala sifa not very good (and similarly with lafa bad)
sisire wind, fasi sisire gale, sisire fasi cyclone; sifa sisire breeze, sisire sifa movement of air

Questions 
Questions in Solresol are one of the most confusing parts of the language, as they are not given much attention in the original documentation, nor have many examples. However, if they are kept simple and concise, it shouldn't be too difficult to form questions in Solresol.

Sudre's publication includes three examples of interrogative sentences:
Is your health good? - Redofafa?
Will you go to the countryside this year? - Fadoremi?
Will you go to the theatre tonight? - Soldoremi?
To make this an affirmative statement, you add the personal pronoun afterwards:
My health is good. - Redofafa dore.
I will go to the countryside this year. - Fadoremi dore.
I will go to the theatre tonight. - Soldoremi dore.

Gajewski ignores this, and uses a common European method of forming questions; by placing the subject of the sentence after the verb instead of before the verb. Some examples are:
Am I? - Faremi dore?
Does he understand? - Falafa dofa?
Are you learning? - Sidosi domi?

As you can see, without indicating which method you are using, it may be confusing to understand whether someone is asking a question, or stating an answer to one.

In all versions of the language, there are words in the 4-syllable, repeated "Mi" section of the dictionary which includes some common questions, such as:
Miladodo? - To what extent/degree?
Milarere? - Well?
Misirere? - Who is it?

Methods of communication

Symbols 
Each "note" of Solresol is represented as a symbol, for example, "Do" is a circle, "Re" is a vertical line, "Mi" and "La" are both half-circles, the former facing downwards, the latter facing right, "Fa" is a diagonal line from left-top to right-bottom, "Sol" is a horizontal line, and "Si or Ti" is a diagonal line from left-bottom to right-top.

Words of Solresol are formed by connecting the symbols in the order they appear in the word.

Further attributes 

 impartial and relatively simple
 integrated systems (signs, colors, etc.) for most different handicapped people, immediately operative without special learning
 gives fast learning success to illiterate people (only seven syllables or signs or ten letters to know and to recognize)
 very simple but effective system to differentiate the function of the words in the sentences

Using the Tonic sol-fa system by John Curwen, SolReSol can also be signed.

Further developments

Another way of using Solresol is called ses, and was developed by George Boeree. The notes are given a representative consonant and vowel (or diphthong). The most basic words use the vowel alone; all others begin with a consonant followed by a vowel (or diphthong), etc.
do > p / o
re > k / e
mi > m / i
fa > f / a
sol > s / u
la > l / au
ti > t / ai

In this way, one can write or pronounce words such as these:
do > o (v) - no
re > e (v) - and
fa-la > fau (cv) - good
la-fa > la (cv) - bad
mi-ti-sol-do > maiso (cvcv) - experience
sol-sol-re-do > suko (cvcv) - migraine
do-la-fa-sol > paufu (cvcv) - soup
sol-re-sol > ses (cvc) - language (solresol)
etc.

Because the plural and feminine forms of words in Solresol are indicated by stress or length of sounds, ses uses pau (some) or fai (many) to indicate the plural, and mu (well) to indicate the feminine when necessary.

Encoding
An ISO 639-3 language code had been requested on 28 July 2017, but was rejected on 1 February 2018.

The seven basic symbols have been proposed to be registered in the ConScript Unicode Registry.

Example text 
Article 1 of the Universal Declaration of Human Rights in Solresol:
Siré misolredo faremi doredore domisómi re misóla, solfalafá dósila re réfasi. Dófa faremi remila fare dômilafa re dôfasifa, re fafa fasolfa midolǎ fare mîredofa lasi sîmisila.

Article 1 of the Universal Declaration of Human Rights in English:
All human beings are born free and equal in dignity and rights. They are endowed with reason and conscience and should act towards one another in a spirit of brotherhood.

See also 
 Solfege
 Musical language
 Tonic sol-fa
 Voyage to Faremido
 Ro (artificial language)

References 

 Umberto Eco. The Search for the Perfect Language. 1993.

External links 

 Langmaker.com about Solresol
 html-version of the text of the book of François Sudre edition from 1866, Gajewski's Grammar of Solresol, edition 1902, translated in different languages, dictionary of Solresol with more than 13.000 French equivalents in a MySQL data base, and different other texts on artificial languages (Esperanto from 1897, Ido from 1908, Occidental from 1930, and soon, Universalglot, Jean Pirro, from 1868)
 Omniglot on the various ways of writing Solresol
 The Athanasius Kircher Society's blog entry on Solresol
 Grammar of Solresol by Boleslas Gajewski
 Solresol-English dictionary, 2600 words
 Solresol-English/French Mini-Dictionary
 Solresol text collection including full Solresol–French dictionary
 Free Solresol to English and English to Solresol translator with live MIDI support
 Solresol-French translator and sound player
 Solresol at the Conlang Atlas of Language Structures.

Analytic languages
Musical languages
Constructed languages
International auxiliary languages
1827 introductions
Languages attested from the 19th century